Rock brake is a common name for several ferns which grow in rocky areas and may refer to:

Cryptogramma
Pellaea (plant)